Lythe Pillay (born 25 February 2003) is a South African athlete. Sprint sensation Lythe Pillay won gold in the men’s 400m final at the World Athletics U20 Championships in Cali, Colombia. He competed in the men's 4 × 400 metres relay event at the 2020 Summer Olympics.

References

External links
 

2003 births
Living people
South African male sprinters
Athletes (track and field) at the 2020 Summer Olympics
Olympic athletes of South Africa
People from Benoni
21st-century South African people
World Athletics U20 Championships winners